Encanto/62nd Street station is a station on the Orange Line of the San Diego Trolley. It is located in the hilly Encanto neighborhood of San Diego, California, and serves both nearby residences and as a park and ride facility.

History
Encanto/62nd Street opened as part of the second segment of the Euclid Line on May 12, 1989.

This station was renovated from October 17, 2011 through fall 2012 as part of the Trolley Renewal Project, although the station remained open during construction.

Station layout
There are two tracks, each served by a side platform.

See also
 List of San Diego Trolley stations

References

Orange Line (San Diego Trolley)
San Diego Trolley stations in San Diego
Railway stations in the United States opened in 1989
1989 establishments in California